Morwa may refer to:

 Morwa, Botswana, a village in Botswana
 Morwa, Bihar, a populated place in India
 Morwa (Vidhan Sabha constituency)
 Morwa, Hormozgan, a village in Iran
 Morwa language, a Niger-Congo language of Nigeria

See also 
 Morua